Combretum mossambicense is a climbing shrub occurring in Eastern Zambia, Zimbabwe and Mozambique.

External links
 

mossambicense